The Citigroup Centre is a building complex in London. It houses Citigroup's EMEA headquarters and is located in Canary Wharf in the city's Docklands. The centre provides  of floor space across two merged buildings - 33 Canada Square (known as "CGC1") and 25 Canada Square (known as "CGC2"), and houses the bulk of Citi's UK employee base. Together, both buildings form the Citigroup Centre complex.

Designed by César Pelli & Associates, construction of the 45-storey tower - undertaken by Canary Wharf Contractors - began in 1998 and was completed in 2001, with Citigroup leasing the building from the outset. The building was bought by RBS in 2004 along with 5 Canada Square (leased to Bank of America) for $1.12 billion. Subsequently, on 2 July 2007, CGC2 was individually sold to a joint venture between Quinlan Private and PropInvest for £1 billion (US$2 billion). Citigroup pay £46.5 million a year in rent for the tower, generating a yield of 4.6% to the owners. The east facing side of 25 Canada Square up to level 40 is configured for use by tenants.

33 Canada Square, or Citigroup Centre 1, is the smaller of the two buildings in the complex, designed by Norman Foster and completed in 1999, two years before its neighbour. The building is owned by Citigroup, and was built before the completion of the Jubilee line extension in late 1999.

In addition to main entrances from both Canada Square and Upper Bank Street, Citigroup Centre is also accessible via underground walkways from Canada Place shopping mall and Canary Wharf London Underground station - served by the Jubilee line. The Centre is also close to DLR stations Canary Wharf and Heron Quays, which provide connections with the City, London City Airport and surrounding areas.

See also
List of tallest buildings and structures in London
List of tallest buildings and structures in Great Britain

References 

Skyscrapers in the London Borough of Tower Hamlets
Buildings and structures in the London Borough of Tower Hamlets
Canary Wharf buildings
Citigroup buildings
César Pelli buildings
Skyscraper office buildings in London